Harry George Henn (October 8, 1919 - October 11, 1994) was a law professor at Cornell University and an author of widely used law books.

Henn was born in New Rochelle, New York. He received an undergraduate degree from New York University and his law degree from Cornell.

He was an expert in copyright and corporate law.

He became a professor at Cornell in 1958 and in 1970 was named the first Edward Cornell Professor of Law, a chair he held until his retirement in 1985, and which is currently held by Robert C. Hockett.

He retired to Naples, Florida and died in Jacksonville, Florida of myelodysplastic anemia.

References 

New York (state) lawyers
Cornell Law School faculty
1994 deaths
1919 births
New York University alumni
Cornell Law School alumni
20th-century American lawyers